Keepers of the Funk is the second studio album by American hip hop group Lords of the Underground. It was released on November 1, 1994 via Pendulum Records. Recording sessions took place at House of Hitz in Chestnut Ridge, New York. Production was handled by Marley Marl, K-Def, Lords of the Underground and Andre Booth. It features guest appearances from Sah-B, Deniece Williams, George Clinton, Brian "Bre" Williamson and Supreme C. The album did gain some success, making it to No. 57 on the Billboard 200 and No. 16 on the Top R&B/Hip-Hop Albums chart. The album is now out of print.

Three singles made it to the Billboard charts: "Tic Toc", "What I'm After" and "Faith".

Track listing

Sample credits
Track 3 contains a sample of "La Di Da Di" performed by Doug E. Fresh and Slick Rick
Track 9 features a sample of "Go On And Cry" performed by Les McCann
Track 10 contains exceperts from "Hamp's Hump" performed by Lou Donaldson

Personnel
Al'Terik "Mr. Funke" Wardrick – vocals (tracks: 2-4, 6-12), keyboards (track 11), producer (track 7), co-producer (tracks: 2-6, 8-12)
Dupré "DoItAll" Kelly – vocals (tracks: 2-8, 10-12), producer (track 7), co-producer (tracks: 2-6, 8-12)
Bruce "DJ Lord Jazz" Colston – scratches (tracks: 2-4, 7-10), producer (track 7), co-producer (tracks: 2-6, 8-12)
George Clinton & P-Funk Singers – backing vocals (track 4)
Andre Booth – bass & co-producer (track 4)
Deniece Williams – vocals (track 7)
Carle "Supreme C" Harte – vocals (track 8)
Brian "Bre" Williamson – backing vocals (track 8)
Frank Heller – bass (track 8), mixing (tracks: 2-5, 7-12)
Sakinah "Sah-B" Britton – backing vocals (tracks: 9, 10)
Marlon "Marley Marl" Williams – producer (tracks: 2-4, 8, 11, 12), executive producer
Kevin "K-Def" Hansford – producer (tracks: 5, 6, 9, 10)
Herb Powers Jr. – mastering
Ruben Rodriguez – executive producer
Nicole Dorward – project coordinator
Lu Ann Graffeo – art direction
Diane Cuddy – design
Christian Cortez – logo design
Daniel Hastings – photography
Hafiz Farid – management

Charts

References

External links

1994 albums
Pendulum Records albums
Albums produced by K-Def
Albums produced by Marley Marl
Lords of the Underground albums